Marceau was an ironclad barbette ship built for the French Navy during the 1880s, the lead ship of her class. She served in the Mediterranean Squadron until 1900, when she was rebuilt and subsequently placed in reserve. She returned to service in 1906 as a torpedo training ship. During World War I, she served in Malta and Corfu as a submarine tender. The old ironclad was sold for scrapping in 1920, and while being towed to Toulon, she ran aground in a gale off Bizerte and became stranded. The wreck remained visible there until the 1930s.

Design

Lighter guns allowed a fourth weapon to be added to the main battery, which were rearranged into a lozenge layout that would be used in most French capital ships built over the following ten years. The class was to have comprised four vessels, but the first unit,  had to be redesigned with a reduced armament after construction began after it became apparent that the initial design was not feasible on the specified dimensions. Work on the remaining three vessels had not yet begun, so their design could be enlarged to accommodate the intended armament. The design of the Marceau-class ships was revised repeatedly during construction, and by the time they were completed, they were seriously overweight, which submerged much of their belt armor and degraded their stability. These problems were common for French capital ships of the period.

Characteristics

She displaced . As was common for French warships of the period, her hull featured a pronounced tumblehome shape and had a ram bow. She was fitted with a pair of light military masts equipped with fighting tops that carried some of her light guns and spotted for her main battery. The crew consisted of 647 officers and enlisted men. 

Her propulsion machinery consisted of a pair of compound steam engines that each drove a screw propeller. Steam was provided by eight coal-burning fire-tube boilers that were vented through a single large funnel.

Her main armament consisted of four  28.5-caliber guns mounted in individual barbette mounts, one forward and one aft, both on the centerline, and two amidships in wing mounts. Two of the guns were the M1881 type and the other two were the updated M1884 variant. These guns were supported by a secondary battery of seventeen  M1884 guns, all carried in individual pivot mounts in an unarmored gun battery in the hull, eight guns per broadside, and the last gun in a firing port in the bow. For defense against torpedo boats, she carried an extensive battery of light guns. These included four  M1888 quick-firing guns (QF), twelve  M1885 QF guns, and eight  Hotchkiss revolver cannon. She also carried a single 47 mm revolver cannon that could be fitted to one of her pinnaces, and two 65 mm field guns that could be sent ashore with a landing party. In addition to her gun armament, she was equipped with six  torpedo tubes, all above water; two were in the amidships battery deck forward, two on the armor deck amidships, and the last pair at the same level further aft.

The guns themselves were protected by  gun shields.

Service history

Construction – 1896

Marceau was ordered in October 1880 and her contract was awarded on 27 December 1880, but work did not begin assembling material until 27 January 1882. Her keel was not laid down until 28 November at the  shipyard in La Seyne-sur-Mer. Work proceeded slowly, and she was not launched until 24 May 1887. This was a result of the influence of Admiral Théophile Aube, who was the Minister of Marine in 1886–1887; Aube was a staunch advocate of the so-called  and opposed new battleship construction. Fitting out work was completed much more quickly, however, and she was commissioned to begin sea trials on 27 January 1890. Her initial testing was delayed until September, and she was not fully manned until 17 January 1891. Her official acceptance trials were carried out in February and March, and she was placed into full commission on 14 March.

After her commissioning, she joined a French fleet that visited Kronstadt and was inspected by Czar Alexander III of Russia. On the return voyage, the fleet stopped in Spithead, where Queen Victoria reviewed the ships. This turned out to be the only time Marceau operated in the Atlantic; after returning to France, she was assigned to the Mediterranean Squadron, where she remained for the duration of her career. She participated in the fleet maneuvers that year as part of the 3rd Division, in company with her sister  and Dévastation, the latter serving as the divisional flagship. The maneuvers included an initial period of exercises from 1 to 10 July and then larger-scale maneuvers from 17 to 28 July.

In 1895, Marceau, Courbet, Amiral Baudin, and Formidable all nearly ran aground off Hyères; Marceau and three tugs were used to tow Amiral Baudin back to port. During the 1895 maneuvers, which began on 1 July, Neptune and the rest of the Mediterranean Squadron conducted a training cruise and practice shooting while the Reserve Squadron mobilized its ships. The main period of exercises saw the fleet divided into three units and Marceau was assigned to the second unit, tasked with operating with the first unit to attack the defending third fleet in Ajaccio. The maneuvers concluded on 27 July. The following year, the Mediterranean Squadron consisted of Marceau, her two sisters, the two Amiral Baudin-class ships, Courbet, Dévastation, the ironclad  and the new pre-dreadnought battleship . That year, she served in the 1st Division of the squadron. She participated in the fleet maneuvers that lasted from 17 to 30 July, during which Marceau served as part of the French fleet that attempted to defeat simulated attacks on the French coast. From September to November, she served as the French station ship at Ottoman Crete, which was then in a period of significant unrest. In November, she was replaced by the torpedo cruiser .

1897–1921

They joined the three Marceau, Brennus, Amiral Baudin, and Redoutable in the Mediterranean Squadron. In 1898, Marceau and her sisters were assigned to a new training division that was attached to the Mediterranean fleet. The unit continued into 1899, but later that year, Marceau was transferred to the torpedo school. The unit was commanded by Rear Admiral Gabriel Godin. Marceau and her two sisters were assigned to the 1899 fleet maneuvers, which lasted from 5 to 25 July; during the exercises, Marceau was sent to the port of Bonifacio, Corsica, to demonstrate the suitability of the harbor for a squadron of ironclads. In 1900, the ship was replaced in the torpedo school by Magenta.

In the 1890s, the French began rebuilding older ironclads to prolong their useful lives, and reconstructions for the three Marceaus were authorized in early 1900. Marceau remained nominally assigned to the Reserve Division in early 1900, but she lay at Toulon and did not see activity with the rest of the unit. On 30 August 1900, Marceau returned to La Seyne for a major reconstruction. Her heavy military masts were cut down, her engines were modernized, and her boilers were replaced with sixteen Niclausse boilers. Another 138.6 mm gun was installed in the bow under the forecastle. The work was completed in May 1902, and Marceau underwent a series of sea trials for the remainder of the year. She did not return to active service with the fleet, however, and was thereafter used as a training ship based in Toulon. In 1906, she was converted into a training ship for torpedo operators in Toulon. She served in that capacity from 1907 to 1910, then as a training vessel for electricians from 1911 to 1912. She reverted to training torpedo crews from 1912 to 1914.

After the outbreak of World War I in August 1914, Marceau was converted into a floating workshop to support torpedo boats and submarines. She was initially based in Malta, but was later moved to Corfu and then to Brindisi in January 1918; at the last of the three locations, she served as the command ship for the 1st Submarine Squadron. After the war, in December, she was sent to Bizerte, where she was condemned on 5 July 1919. She was stricken from the naval register on 1 October 1920, and sold to the ship breaking firm M. Saglia based in Toulon on 30 September 1921. She left Bizerte on 17 January 1922, and while she was being towed to Toulon, a storm caused her to run aground off Bizerte. She remained visible there until the 1930s, and she was slowing dismantled in situ.

Footnotes

Notes

Citations

References

Further reading
 

Marceau-class ironclads
Ships built in France
1887 ships
Maritime incidents in 1922
Shipwrecks in the Mediterranean Sea